Alexander Taransky (8 January 1941 – 8 December 2017) was an Australian sports shooter. He competed at the 1968, 1972 and the 1976 Summer Olympics. He was also selected for the Australian Pistol Shooting Team for the 1980 Summer Olympics however the Australian Shooting Team joined the boycott of the Moscow Olympics. He competed at the 1982 Commonwealth Games in Brisbane where he won two gold medals for pistol shooting.

References

External links
 

1941 births
2017 deaths
Australian male sport shooters
Olympic shooters of Australia
Shooters at the 1968 Summer Olympics
Shooters at the 1972 Summer Olympics
Shooters at the 1976 Summer Olympics
Place of birth missing
Commonwealth Games medallists in shooting
Commonwealth Games gold medallists for Australia
Shooters at the 1982 Commonwealth Games
20th-century Australian people
Medallists at the 1982 Commonwealth Games